The American Journal of Economics and Sociology is a peer-reviewed academic journal established in 1941 by Will Lissner with support from the Robert Schalkenbach Foundation. The purpose of the journal was to create a forum for continuing discussion of the issues raised by Henry George, a political economist, social philosopher, and political activist of the late 19th century. The editor-in-chief is Clifford W. Cobb.

Abstracting and indexing
The journal is abstracted and indexed in:
CAB Abstracts
Current Contents/Social & Behavioral Sciences

Scopus
Social Sciences Citation Index
According to the Journal Citation Reports, the journal has a 2018 impact factor of 0.455, ranking it 328th out of 363 in the category "Economics" and 134 out of 148 in the category "Sociology".

See also
 Georgism

References

External links

Economics journals
English-language journals
Georgist publications
Publications established in 1941
Sociology journals
Wiley-Blackwell academic journals
5 times per year journals